Fr Elias Lynch (1897–1967) was the founder of the National Shrine of Saint Jude in England He was a Carmelite Friar.

References

Carmelites
1897 births
1967 deaths